Yaraslav Shyla and Andrei Vasilevski were the defending champions but only Shyla chose to defend his title, partnering Vladyslav Manafov. Shyla lost in the quarterfinals to Evgeny Karlovskiy and Evgeny Tyurnev.

Toshihide Matsui and Vishnu Vardhan won the title after defeating Karlovskiy and Tyurnev 7–6(7–3), 6–7(5–7), [10–7] in the final.

Seeds

Draw

References
 Main Draw

President's Cup (tennis) - Men's Doubles
2017 Men's Doubles